Sormany is an unincorporated community in Gloucester County, New Brunswick, Canada.

History

Notable people

See also
List of communities in New Brunswick

References

Communities in Gloucester County, New Brunswick